Five Points is a town in Chambers County, Alabama, United States. At the 2020 census, the population was 114.

History
In 1885, Five Points was named because of the five roads converging at a single point. Before this, the post office was known as "Lystra". The town was incorporated in 1915, making it Chambers County's oldest incorporated town. The Baptist Church was the first to take the name of "Five Points" on its building in 1929.

Five Points holds the distinction of being the first town of its size to receive electricity from Alabama Power in 1925. In order to receive power, citizens were required to erect their own poles from Stroud to White Plains.

Five Points is home to the first consolidated high school in Alabama. The original Five Points High School was an imposing brick building which had two floors above a full basement and a large auditorium that seated 400 people. Erected in 1916, it stood amidst an  campus, the only rural school in the state with its own electric and steam-generating plant and water works. The school building was replaced by a one-story building in 1939. In 1974 a fire destroyed that structure which was replaced by the present building.

The town elected its first African-American mayor, Geneva Bledsoe, in 1992. The current mayor is Derrick L. Wright Sr. who won the election by a vote of 50–32 in August 2012.

Geography
Five Points is located in northern Chambers County at 33°1'1.880" North, 85°21'4.349" West (33.017189, -85.351208). According to the U.S. Census Bureau, the town has a total area of  all land.

Demographics

As of the census of 2000, there were 146 people, 58 households, and 41 families residing in the town. The racial makeup of the town was 52.05% Black or African American, 47.26% White and 0.68% from two or more races.

There were 58 households, out of which 25.9% had children under the age of 18 living with them, 48.3% were married couples living together, 19.0% had a female householder with no husband present, and 27.6% were non-families. 25.9% of all households were made up of individuals, and 12.1% had someone living alone who was 65 years of age or older. The average household size was 2.52 and the average family size was 3.05.

In the town, the population was spread out, with 24.0% under the age of 18, 9.6% from 18 to 24, 23.3% from 25 to 44, 26.0% from 45 to 64, and 17.1% who were 65 years of age or older. The median age was 36 years. For every 100 females, there were 97.3 males. For every 100 females age 18 and over, there were 85.0 males.

The median income for a household in the town was $38,125, and the median income for a family was $41,750. Males had a median income of $21,250 versus $20,000 for females. The per capita income for the town was $12,764. There were 8.9% of families and 13.9% of the population living below the poverty line, including 26.3% of under eighteens and 6.1% of those over 64.

Notable persons
 Razzy Bailey (1939–2021), country music artist
 John McDade Howell (1922–2016), president of East Carolina University from 1982 to 1987

Gallery

References 

Towns in Alabama
Towns in Chambers County, Alabama